Rockville in the U.S. state of Wisconsin may refer to:
Rockville, Grant County, Wisconsin, an unincorporated community
Rockville, Manitowoc County, Wisconsin, an unincorporated community